Pavel Lovgach (born 2 March 1995) is a Belarusian professional footballer who plays for Ostrovets.

References

External links 
 
 

1995 births
Living people
Belarusian footballers
Association football midfielders
FC Minsk players
FC Smorgon players
FC Oshmyany players
FC Baranovichi players
FC Dnepr Mogilev players
FC Molodechno players
FC Ostrovets players